The Nordenskjöld ( or ) is a lake in Torres del Paine National Park in the Magallanes Region, southern Chile. The lake is named after the Swede Otto Nordenskiöld who discovered the lake in the beginning of the 20th century. The outfall of Nordenskjöld Lake consists of a waterfall known as Salto Grande. At this western end of the lake on the southern side is an abundance of wildlife including wild grazing guanaco.

See also
 French Glacier

Notes

References
 Gobierno de Chile. 2004.  Cuenca del Río Serrano
 C. Michael Hogan. 2008. Guanaco: Lama guanicoe, GlobalTwitcher.com, ed. N. Strömberg
 Earth Info. 2002. earth-info.nga.mil webpage: Complete Files of Geographic Names for Geopolitical Areas from GNS (ISO/IEC 10646 Unicode UTF-8)

Lakes of Chile
Lakes of Magallanes Region
Torres del Paine National Park